In particle physics, isoscalar refers to the scalar transformation of a particle or field under the SU(2) group of isospin. It is a singlet state, with total Isospin 0 and the third component of Isospin 0, much like a singlet state in a 2-particle addition of Spin.

See also isovector.

Subatomic particles with spin 0